Col. Thomas Walcot (1625 – July 20, 1683) born in Warwickshire, the fourth son of Charles Walcot and Elizabeth Games, was a Puritan and Lt. Col. in the Parliamentary Army. Thomas married Jane Blayney, (daughter of Thomas Blayney, niece of Edward Blayney, 1st Baron Blayney and grand-niece of Adam Loftus (bishop)) purchased Ballyvarra Castle in 1655, and in 1659 was at Dunmurry. He settled at Croagh, Co. Limerick, Ireland where he had an estate of £800 per annum. He also had lands at Amogan in the Barony of Lower Conneloe. He was offered the Governorship of Province of Carolina, but declined it.
Arrested in 1672 on allegation of planning a Dutch invasion of Ireland. Spent eight months in Tower of London before being exonerated.

Walcot was arrested on July 8 or 10, 1683 for his part in the Rye House Plot, a conspiracy to assassinate Charles II and his brother, James, Duke of York, as they traveled from the Newmarket races to London past Rye House in Hertfordshire.

Walcot stood trial on July 12, 1683 at the Sessions-House in the Old Bailey London for High Treason
Walcot was hanged, drawn and quartered on July 20, 1683 at Tyburn Hill (Marble Arch) in London and head exhibited on spike at Aldgate. He was the last man in England to undergo this punishment.

William Russell, Lord Russell, cousin of Thomas Walcot, was also convicted and executed. Algernon Sidney,  was convicted on weaker evidence by Judge George Jeffreys, 1st Baron Jeffreys, who was brought in as Lord Chief Justice in September 1683.

Thomas Walcot was exonerated by the reversal of attainder in 1696 in favor of his eldest son, John under William III of England.

References 

1625 births
1683 deaths
People of the Rye House Plot
English soldiers
Executed military personnel
People executed at Tyburn
People executed by Stuart England by hanging, drawing and quartering
Executed people from Warwickshire
Military personnel from Warwickshire